The Four Feathers is a novel written by A. E. W. Mason. It has been adapted for film numerous times:

Cinema 
 Four Feathers, a 1915 silent film
 The Four Feathers (1921 film), a silent film
 The Four Feathers (1929 film), a silent film featuring Richard Arlen
 The Four Feathers (1939 film), starring John Clements
 The Four Feathers (2002 film), starring Heath Ledger

Television 
 The Four Feathers (1978 film), a television film with Beau Bridges in the lead role

See also
Storm Over the Nile, a 1955 adaptation which borrowed heavily from the 1939 film